A by-election was held in the Welsh parliamentary constituency of Islwyn on 16 February 1995 following the resignation on 20 January of Neil Kinnock who was appointed as a European Commissioner.

Whilst being a safe Labour seat and a comfortable victory, the Conservative party suffered a serious drop in support which saw them lose their deposit, gaining less than 5% of the vote. The Conservative candidate, Robert Buckland, would later be elected as MP for South Swindon 15 years later, and would go on to serve in the cabinet.

Results

See also
List of United Kingdom by-elections

References

By-elections to the Parliament of the United Kingdom in Welsh constituencies
Islwyn by-election
Islwyn by-election
1990s elections in Wales
Islwyn by-election